John Harley Burke (June 2, 1894 – May 14, 1951) was an American lawyer, real estate broker and politician. The Democrat served as the first United States Representative from California's 18th congressional district for one term, from 1933 to 1935.

Background
Burke was born on June 2, 1894 in Excelsior in Richland County, Wisconsin. At the age of three, he moved with his parents to Milaca, Minnesota. Three years later, they moved to San Pedro, California, before settling in Long Beach, California in 1909. After attending public school in Long Beach, Burke went on to attend the University of Santa Clara and the law department of the University of Southern California at Los Angeles. After obtaining his Bachelor of Laws degree, he was admitted to the bar in 1917 and started up his law practice in Long Beach. During World War I, Burke served as a private, first class in the 12th Training Training Battery of the Field Artillery in Camp Taylor, Kentucky. After the war, he got himself involved in the oil business.

Politics
Burke first ran in 1932 for the United States House of Representatives seat for California's 18th congressional district, just recently formed. The Democrat Burke beat the Republican Robert Henderson and the Independent William E. Hinshaw, by capturing 53.2% of the vote in comparison to 37.4% and 9.3% for the other two candidates, respectively.

Burke was not a candidate for renomination in the 1934 House elections and he went back to Long Beach, California to engage in real estate business. He continued until his death there on May 14, 1951. He was then interred at Calvary Cemetery in East Los Angeles, California.

References

External links
Biography at the Biographical Directory of the United States Congress
The Political Graveyard profile for John Harley Burke

1894 births
1951 deaths
Democratic Party members of the United States House of Representatives from California
People from Richland County, Wisconsin
People from Milaca, Minnesota
USC Gould School of Law alumni
Santa Clara University alumni
20th-century American politicians
Military personnel from California
Military personnel from Wisconsin
United States Army personnel of World War I
United States Army soldiers